Bloška Polica is a village east of Grahovo in the Municipality of Cerknica in the Inner Carniola region of Slovenia.

Name
Bloška Polica was attested in written sources as Oblackher Politz in 1384 and Polcz ze Obluk in 1397.

Church

The local church in the settlement is dedicated to Saint Vincent and belongs to the Parish of Stari Trg.

References

External links 

Bloška Polica on Geopedia

Populated places in the Municipality of Cerknica